Take It Back! was an American rock band from Fayetteville, Arkansas. The band started making music in 2005, and disbanded in 2009. Their membership was vocalist, Nick Thomas, guitarists, Daniel Hawkins and Cody Bradley, and drummer, Josh Huskey. The band released an extended play, Rumors of Revolt, in 2009, with Facedown Records. Their first studio album, Can't Fight Robots, was released by Facedown Records, in 2008. The subsequent studio album, Atrocities, was released by Facedown Records, in 2009, as their final recording.

Background
Take It Back! comes from Fayetteville, Arkansas. Their members were vocalist, Nick Thomas, guitarists, Daniel Hawkins and Cody Bradley, and drummer, Josh Huskey.

Music history
The band commenced as a musical entity in 2005, with their first release, Can't Fight Robots, a studio album, that was released by Facedown Records on June 24, 2008. They released an extended play, Rumors of Revolt, on August 18, 2009 with Facedown Records. Their second studio album, Atrocities, was released by Facedown Records on November 10, 2009.

Members
Last Known Line-up
 Daniel Hawkins - guitar
 Cody Bradley - guitar
 Josh Huskey - drums
 Zack McKim - vocals
 Devin Henderson - bass

Former Members
 Nick Thomas - vocals
 Keevan Merrill - vocals

Discography
Studio albums
 Can't Fight Robots (June 24, 2008, Facedown)
 Atrocities (November 10, 2009, Facedown)
EPs
 Rumors of Revolt (August 18, 2009, Facedown)

References

External links
 Cross Rhythms artist profile

American hardcore punk groups
2005 establishments in Arkansas
2009 disestablishments in Arkansas
Musical groups established in 2005
Musical groups disestablished in 2009
Facedown Records artists
Rock music groups from Arkansas
American screamo musical groups
Melodic hardcore groups